The House of Abamelik (also rendered as Abamelek, Abymelikov) was a noble family of Armenian origin in the Kingdom of Georgia, and then in the Russian Empire.

History 
According to the Brockhaus and Efron Encyclopedic Dictionary (1890–1906), the family attained to the dignity of princes of the 3rd rank when the Georgian crown prince David (1767–1819) married Helene (1770–1836), daughter of the priest Simon Abamelik, in 1800. The family was officially included in the List of Georgian Princes of the Russian Empire in 1850.

In 1873, Major-General Semyon Abamelik (1815–1888) was granted the right to assume the surname of his late father-in-law, Khristofor Yakimovich Lazarev (1789–1871), for himself and his descendants — the princes Abamelik-Lazarev (Абамелик-Лазаревы). By 1906, both the Abamelik and Abamelik-Lazarev lines were registered in the governorates of Moscow, Podolsk, and Tula.

The Armenian composer Makar Yekmalyan dedicated his Nocturne for piano to Prince Semyon Abamelik-Lazarev.

In Rome there is a Villa Abamelek, which nowadays, is the residence of the Russian ambassador to the Italian Republic.

See also
 List of Georgian princely families

References

Abamelik family